Bartramia halleriana, the Haller's apple-moss or Haller's bartramia moss, is a species of moss in the family Bartramiaceae.

References

External links

pc.gc.ca - Plants at Risk: Bartramia halleriana
mb.ec.gc.ca - Jasper National Park: Bartramia halleriana

halleriana